Loganic acid is an iridoid.  Loganic acid is synthesized from 7-deoxyloganic acid by the enzyme 7-deoxyloganic acid hydroxylase (7-DLH).  It is a substrate for the enzyme loganate O-methyltransferase for the production of loganin.

References

Iridoid glycosides
Glucosides
Carboxylic acids
Cyclopentanes